Eupithecia druentiata is a moth in the family Geometridae. It is found in France, Spain, Italy, Austria, Slovenia and most of the Balkan Peninsula.

The wingspan is about 20–22 mm.

The larvae feed on Artemisia alba.

Gallery

References

Moths described in 1902
druentiata
Moths of Europe